nrx or NRX may refer to:

NRX, a nuclear reactor in Canada
Neoreaction, or the Dark Enlightenment, a social movement